In mathematics, the Riemann Xi function is a variant of the Riemann zeta function, and is defined so as to have a particularly simple functional equation. The function is named in honour of Bernhard Riemann.

Definition
Riemann's original lower-case "xi"-function,  was renamed with an upper-case  (Greek letter "Xi") by Edmund Landau. Landau's lower-case  ("xi") is defined as  

The functional equation (or reflection formula) for Landau's  is
 
Riemann's original function, rebaptised upper-case  by Landau, satisfies 
,
and obeys the functional equation

Both functions are entire and purely real for real arguments.

Values
The general form for positive even integers is

where Bn denotes the n-th Bernoulli number. For example:

Series representations
The  function has the series expansion

where

This expansion plays a particularly important role in Li's criterion, which states that the Riemann hypothesis is equivalent to having λn > 0 for all positive n.

Hadamard product
A simple infinite product expansion is

where ρ ranges over the roots of ξ.

To ensure convergence in the expansion, the product should be taken over "matching pairs" of zeroes, i.e., the factors for a pair of zeroes of the form ρ and 1−ρ should be grouped together.

References

 
 

Zeta and L-functions
Bernhard Riemann